Statistics of the Primera División de México for the 1959–60 season.

Overview

Tampico was promoted to Primera División.

It was contested by 14 teams, and Guadalajara won the championship and becomes second team to win consecutive championships.

Zamora was relegated to Segunda División.

Teams

League standings

Results

References
Mexico - List of final tables (RSSSF)

1959-60
Mex
1959–60 in Mexican football